Saint Michael's of Rochester Roman Catholic church located in Rochester, New York.

History
It was designed by German-born architect, Adolphus Druiding. Plans and designs for the church began in 1887, and in 1890 it was finished and dedicated. The Lockport sandstone and Medina brownstone were hauled by barge down the Erie Canal. The building was designed to seat 1,100 parishioners. The organ was built by J. W. Steere & Son Organ Company of Springfield, Mass and has 2,169 pipes. The church bells were manufactured by the Meneely and Kimberly foundry, and by the McShane Bell Foundry.

Gallery

See also
List of tallest buildings in Rochester, New York

References

http://sfxcrochester.org

External links

Website

Roman Catholic churches in Rochester, New York
Roman Catholic churches completed in 1890
19th-century Roman Catholic church buildings in the United States